This is a list of notable Jamaican Americans, including both original immigrants who obtained American citizenship and their American descendants.

List

Academics 

 Opal Palmer Adisa – Professor Emeritus at California College of the Arts
 Elizabeth Alexander – Wun Tsun Tam Mellon Professor in the Humanities in the Department of English and Comparative Literature, Columbia University. Chancellor Emeritus of the Academy of American Poets
 Deborah Archer – Jacob K. Javits Professor at New York University and Professor of Clinical Law at New York University School of Law
 Frederic G. Cassidy (1907-2000) – Professor of English at the University of Wisconsin-Madison. Founder of the Dictionary of American Regional English 
 Susan Collins – Provost and Executive Vice President for Academic Affairs at University of Michigan. The Edward M. Gramlich Collegiate Professor of Public Policy and Professor of Economics
 Paul R. Cunningham – Dean Emeritus of the Brody School of Medicine at East Carolina University. The first African-American to serve as dean of the Brody School
 Trevor Dawes – Vice Provost for Libraries and Museums and May Morris University Librarian. President of the Association of College and Research Libraries
 Tashni-Ann Dubroy – Executive Vice President and Chief Operations Officer (COO) of Howard University
 Carol Lani Guinier (1950-2022) – Bennett Boskey Professor of Law at Harvard Law School. The first woman of colour appointed to a tenured professorship at Harvard law school
 Ewart Guinier (1910-1990) – founding chairman of Harvard University's Department of African and African-American Studies
 Donald J. Harris – Professor Emeritus at Stanford University, father of the 49th vice president of the United States, Kamala Harris
 Odette Harris – Professor of Neurosurgery at Stanford University and the Director of the Brain Injury Program for the Stanford University School of Medicine. America’s second Black female professor of neurosurgery 
 Peter Blair Henry – Dean of New York University's Leonard N. Stern School of Business and William R. Berkley Professor of Economics and Business
 Jason D. Hill – Professor of Philosophy at DePaul University
 Robert A. Hill – Professor Emeritus of History and Research Professor at the University of California, Los Angeles (UCLA)
 William Jacob Holland (1848-1932) – Chancellor of the University of Pittsburgh and Director of the Carnegie Museums of Pittsburgh
 Jacqueline Hughes-Oliver – Professor of Statistics at North Carolina State University
 Gene Andrew Jarrett –  Dean of the Faculty and William S. Tod Professor of English at Princeton University. Founding editor-in-chief of the Oxford Bibliographies module on African American Studies
 Marcia V. Keizs – former president of York College, City University of New York
 Heather Knight – former president of Pacific Union College.The first black president and first female president in Pacific Union College history. The first black female to lead a Seventh-day Adventist college in the United States
 Charles Wade Mills (1951-2021) – Professor at Graduate Center, CUNY and Northwestern University
 Keith Anthony Morrison – Dean of the Tyler School of Art at Temple University in Philadelphia 
 Colin A. Palmer (1944-2019) – Dodge Professor of History at Princeton University 
 Orlando Patterson – The John Cowles Professor of Sociology at Harvard University 
 Paul Ramphal – Adjunct Assistant Professor of Surgery at the University of North Carolina at Chapel Hill 
 Donald Richards – Distinguished Professor Emeritus of Statistics at Pennsylvania State University 
 Dorceta Taylor – Senior Associate Dean of Diversity, Equity, and Inclusion at Yale School of the Environment. Also Yale's Professor of Environmental Justice  She was the first African American woman to earn a doctoral degree from Yale School of Forestry & Environmental Studies 
 Ekwueme Michael Thelwell – founding chairman of the Department of African-American Studies at the University of Massachusetts Amherst 
 Heather A. Williams – Geraldine R. Segal Professor of American Social Thought and Professor of Africana Studies at the University of Pennsylvania
 Henry Vernon Wong –  Professor Emeritus at the University of Texas, Austin

Actors
 Roxanne Beckford
 Tyson Beckford
 Harry Belafonte – Emmy, Oscar and Tony Awards winner. The first black actor to win an Emmy
 Shari Belafonte
 Marsha Stephanie Blake
 Corbin Bleu – film/television actor and vocalist (High School Musical)
 Parisa Fitz-Henley
 Antonia Gentry
 Dulé Hill
 Grace Jones
 Robinne Lee
 Delroy Lindo
 Carl Lumbly
Camille McDonald
Alano Miller
Wentworth Miller
Shameik Moore
Lewis Morrison (1844/5 -1906) Grandparent to Constance and Joan Bennett
Olivia Olson
Evan Parke
Jada Pinkett Smith
Sheryl Lee Ralph
David Reivers
Gloria Reuben
Antoinette Robertson
Frank Silvera (1914 -1970)
Madge Sinclair (1938 -1995) – Primetime Emmy Award winner
Basil Wallace
Kerry Washington – Primetime Emmy Award winner
Susan Kelechi Watson
Robert Wisdom

Business 

 Richard Arthur Bogle (1835-1904) – Walla Walla's first black businessman. Co-founder of the Walla Walla Savings and Loan Association
 Ann-Marie Campbell – Executive Vice President, U.S. Stores & International Operations, The Home Depot
 Vincent "Randy" Chin (1937-2003) – founder of  VP Records
 Susan Collins – President and CEO of the Federal Reserve Bank of Boston (from July 2022). The first black female to lead a regional Federal bank
 Emma Grede – CEO and co-founder (with Khloe Kardashian) of Good American. Founding partner of Skims.
 Golden Krust – founded in Jamaica by the Hawthorne family. Over 100 Golden Krust restaurants operate in the U.S
 Vincent HoSang – CEO and founder of Caribbean Food Delights and Royal Caribbean Bakery
 James Bruce Llewelly (1927-2010) – businessman, personal wealth estimated to exceed $160 million
 Pat McGrath – British Jamaican based in New York. Founder of Pat McGrath Labs which has as an estimated value of $1 billion
 Graham N Robinson –  Senior Vice President and President of STANLEY Industrial, Stanley Black & Decker
 Janice Savin Williams –Senior Principal and co-founder of The Williams Capital Group, L.P
 Jacky Wright –Chief Digital Officer and Corporate Vice President at Microsoft US

Law 

 Deborah Archer – President of the American Civil Liberties Union, the first African American to hold the position. Civil rights lawyer
 Michelle Bernard – President and CEO of the Bernard Centre For Women, Politics & Public Policy. Lawyer and political analyst
 Renatha Francis – circuit judge
 Claudia L. Gordon – lawyer, the first deaf black female attorney in the United States and the first deaf graduate of American University's law school
 Carol Lani Guinier (1950-2022) – civil rights lawyer
 Ewart Guinier (1910-1990) – lawyer and trades union leader
 Maya Harris – lawyer and public policy advocate. Sister of the 49th vice president of the United States, Kamala Harris
 Sheila Jackson Lee – lawyer and politician
 Leondra kruger – Associate Justice of the Supreme Court of California. Acting Principal Deputy Solicitor General of the United States in the Obama administration
 David Patrick Rowe (1959-2018) – lawyer
 Jewel Scott – first Jamaican American judge in Georgia. First Jamaican American (female) appointed as a Judge of the Clayton County Superior Court. First woman and first Caribbean-American District Attorney for Clayton County.
 Alison Smith – lawyer, the first black woman president of Florida's Broward County Bar Association
 James Lopez Watson(1922-2001) – judge of the United States Court of International Trade. The first African-American to head a federal court in the American Deep South.
 James S. Watson(1882-1952) – one of the first two black Americans elected as a judge in the state of New York. The first justice of African descent to sit in judgment on white litigants and the first African American attorney nominated to the American Bar Association since 1912
 Barbara M. Watson(1918-1983) – lawyer and diplomat. The first black person and the first woman to serve as an Assistant Secretary of State
 Damian Williams – lawyer, the first African-American U.S. attorney for the Southern District of New York

Military 

 Clifford Alexander Jr.– Former Secretary of the Army, the first African American to hold the position
 John Davis (1854 -1903) – United States Navy sailor, recipient of the United States military's highest decoration, the Medal of Honor
 Lorna Mahlock – Brigadier General in the United States Marine Corps. The first black female to hold the position
 Jeanine Menze –  Commander and the first black female aviator in the history of the U.S. Coast Guard
 Colin Luther Powell (1937-2021) –  statesman and four-star general in the United States Army
 Vincent R. Stewart – first African American, first Jamaican American and first Marine to hold the position of Director of the DIA

Musicians

 A-Plus 
 Astro – rapper
 Joey Bada$$ – rapper
 Afrika Bambaataa
 Harry Belafonte – three-time Grammy Award winner 
 Thom Bell – one of the creators of Philadelphia soul. Two-time Grammy Award winner
 Big Tigger
 Bushwick Bill (1966-2019)
 Busta Rhymes
 Bobby Shmurda
 Luther Campbell
 Canibus
 Capital STEEZ (1993-2012)
 Chubb Rock
 Sandra Denton – Grammy Award winner
 Delroy Edwards
 Etana
 Chuck Fenda
 Flatbush Zombies
 Funkmaster Flex
 CJ Fly
 Heavy D (1967-2011)
 Hodgy Beats
 Grand Puba
 Tori Kelly – two-time Grammy Award winner
 Sean Kingston
 DJ Kool Herc
 KRS-One
 Alaine Laughton
 Uncle Luke
 Masego
 Stephen Marley – eight-time Grammy Award winner
 Denroy Morgan (1945-2022)
 Gramps Morgan – member of Grammy Award-winning reggae band Morgan Heritage
 DJ Mustard
 Mýa – Grammy Award winner
 NLE Choppa
 Renee Neufville
 The Notorious B.I.G.(1972-1997) – rapper
 Olivia
 Styles P
 Christopher "Kid" Reid
 Pretty Ricky
 Tarrus Riley
 Pete Rock
 Safaree Samuels
 Gil Scott-Heron (1949-2011) – Grammy Lifetime Achievement Award
 Shaggy – two-time Grammy Award winner
 Ski Mask the Slump God – rapper
 Pop Smoke – rapper
 Robb Banks
 Justine Skye
 Sleepy Hallow
 Ernie Smith
 Wifisfuneral – rapper
 Mike Smith
 Simi Sernaker
 Special Ed
 Lil Tecca – rapper
 Tyga – rapper
 will.i.am – rapper
 XXXTentacion – rapper
 YFN Lucci – rapper
 Young M.A – rapper
 JPEGMafia
 Tevin Campbell – singer

Politics 

 Ronald Blackwood (1926–2017) – Mayor of Mount Vernon, New York (1985–1996), first elected black mayor in New York state
 Michael Blake – former vice chair of the Democratic National Committee (DNC)
 David Bowen – member of the Wisconsin State Assembly
 Anthony Brown – Democratic member of the U.S. House of Representatives
 Tanya S. Chutkan – judge of the United States District Court for the District of Columbia
 Kristen Clarke – Head of the U.S. Department of Justice Civil Rights Division, the first woman to hold the position
 Yvette Clarke – Democratic member of the U.S. House of Representatives
 Jacob Raphael De Cordova (1808–1868) – elected to the Texas House of Representatives. Founder of the Jamaica Gleaner
 Brian A. Cunningham – member of the New York State Assembly
 Alexander J. Dallas (1759–1817) – United States Secretary of the Treasury under President James Madison
 Claudia L. Gordon – Associate director in the White House Office of Public Engagement. The first deaf person to work at the White House in a detailee capacity
 Denise D. Grant – City of Lauderhill Commissioner
 Kamala Harris – Vice President of the United States; former U.S. Senator from California. The first African American vice president, the first female vice president and the highest-ranking female official in U.S. history
 Dale Holness – Broward County Commissioner and former Mayor of Broward County
 Sheila Jackson Lee – Democrat, U.S. representative for Texas's 18th congressional district
 Leondra Kruger – California Supreme Court Justice
Donna McLeod – member of the Georgia House of Representatives
 Wayne Messam – Mayor of Miramar, Florida
Shirley Nathan-Pulliam – former member of the Maryland State Senate
 Anika Omphroy – member of the Florida House of Representatives
Basil A. Paterson (1926–2014) – former Secretary of State of New York; father of David Paterson
 David Paterson – Governor of New York, the first African American to serve as governor of New York.
N. Nick Perry – member of the New York State Senate
 Colin Powell (1937–2021) – 65th United States Secretary of State, the first African American Secretary of State 
Michael Powell – former Chair of the Federal Communications Commission (FCC); son of Colin Powell
Marcia Ranglin-Vassell – member of the Rhode Island House of Representatives
Kenneth Reeves – former Mayor of Cambridge, Massachusetts
Pauline Rhodd-Cummings (1945–2002) – member of the New York State Assembly, the first woman of Caribbean descent elected to the state Assembly
Susan Rice – Director of the White House Domestic Policy Council
Hazelle P. Rogers – Mayor of Lauderdale Lakes, Florida; former member of the Florida House of Representatives
Winsome Sears – former member of the Virginia House of Delegates. Lieutenant Governor of Virginia, the first female and woman of colour to hold the office
Edward A. Stevenson Sr. (1907–1980) – member of the New York State Assembly, the first Caribbean American to serve in the Assembly
Jheanelle Wilkins – member of the Maryland House of Delegates, the first black female ever elected to the district

Science and technology 
 Evan Abel – endocrinologist, identified the link between adipose tissue glucose transporter (GLUT4) and insulin resistance
 Walt W. Braithwaite – engineer, led the development of computer-aided design/computer-aided manufacturing (CAD/CAM) systems at Boeing. Also made significant contributions to the development of the Initial Graphics Exchange Specification (IGES). Braithwaite's common data format and translators from Boeing were subsequently used as the basis for developing the IGES protocol.
 Nadine Burke Harris – California's first-ever Surgeon General. Pediatrician who linked traumatic childhood experiences and poor health
 Paul R. Cunningham – surgeon
 Ira Ferguson (1904-1992) – clinical psychologist
 Yvette Francis-McBarnette (1926-2016) – pioneering pediatrician, the first practitioner to use prophylactic antibiotics in the treatment of children with sickle cell.  Second ever black woman to enrol at the Yale School of Medicine in 1946
 Neil Hanchard – physician and scientist, clinical investigator in the National Human Genome Research Institute
 Karen E. Nelson – microbiologist, published the first ever comprehensive human microbiome study
 Robert Rashford – aerospace engineer, co-invented the world's first portable 3D non-destructive evaluation (NDE) system. This invention was used in the maintenance of the United States Government's Hubble Space Telescope. Rashford also invented a protective enclosure for use transporting orbital replacement units (orus). Rashford designed and developed unique spacecraft support systems for the Upper Atmosphere Research Satellite (UARS) Airborne Support Equipment (UASE) at the Orbital Sciences Corporation (OSC). At General Electric, he designed and tested a variety of spacecraft for both commercial and military applications. At Bechtel Corporation, he designed a nuclear reactor support structure. He has designed numerous highly complex engineering systems that successfully flew on board NASA's Manned Space Flight Programs.
 Mercedes Richards (1955-2016) – pioneering scientist, the first astronomer to make images of the gravitational flow of gas between the stars in any interacting binary; the first to image the chromospheres and accretion disks in Algol binaries; the first in astronomy to apply the technique of tomography; the first astrophysicist to make theoretical hydrodynamic simulations of the Algol binary stars; the first astronomer to discover starspots on the cool star in an Algol binary and the first astrophysicist to apply novel distance correlation statistical methods to large astronomical databases
 John Thompson – computer programmer, invented the Lingo programming language used in Adobe Director

Sports
 

 Timroy Allen - cricketer
 Kyle Anderson - basketball player
 Alicia Ashley - boxer, former WBC female world super bantamweight champion
 Corey Ballentine - football player 
 Barrington Bartley - cricketer
 Claudine Beckford - cricketer
 Shaun Bridgmohan - jockey
 C. B. Bucknor - umpire in Major League Baseball 
 Jade Cargill - professional wrestler and fitness model
 Patrick Chung - retired football player
 Jeff Cunningham - former professional soccer player 
 Chili Davis - baseball player, the first ballplayer born in Jamaica to appear in an MLB game
 Kenrick Dennis(1966-2003) - cricketer
 Andre Drummond - basketball player
 Patrick Ewing - retired basketball player who played with the New York Knicks
Patrick Ewing Jr. - basketball player
Sandra Farmer-Patrick - athlete
 Heather Foster - professional bodybuilder
 Colin Fowles (1953-1985) - soccer player
 Robin Fraser - soccer coach and former player
 Tony Gonzalez - retired football player
 Ben Gordon - British-born Charlotte Bobcats basketball player
 Uriah Hall -  professional mixed martial artist and former kickboxer
 Kwame Harris - footballer
 Sek Henry - basketball player
 Roy Hibbert - basketball player
 Danielle Hunter- football player
 Elmore Hutchinson - cricketer
 Kamara James (1984-2014) - Olympic fencer
 Andrew Kennedy - basketball player
 Big E Langston - professional wrestler, former WWE champion
 Jonathan Lewis - soccer player
 Rajiv Maragh - jockey
 Floyd Mayweather Jr. - boxer, won world championships from super featherweight to light middleweight.
 Justin Masterson - Major League baseball pitcher
 Matt Peart - footballer
 Norman Powell - basketball player
 Suziann Reid - sprinter
 Sanya Richards-Ross - Olympic and World championship winning sprinter
 Errol Spence - championship winning professional boxer
 Aljamain Sterling - mixed martial arts fighter, UFC Bantamweight Champion
Isaiah Stewart - basketball player
 Ndamukong Suh - football player
 Mike Tyson - retired boxer, former heavyweight champion
 Olivier Vernon - football player
 Devon White - baseball player
Tristan Thompson - basketball player
 Allyssa Lyn "Lacey" Lane - professional wrestler

Writers, poets and journalists 

 Opal Palmer Adisa – award-winning writer, poet, performance artist
 Gil Bailey (1936-2020) –  radio broadcaster, known as the "Godfather of Caribbean/Reggae Radio"
 Michelle Bernard – Journalist, author
 Colin Channer –  writer
 Staceyann Chin – award-winning spoken-word poet and activist
 Michel du Cille (1956-2014) – Pulitzer prize winning photojournalist 
 Michelle Cliff (1946-2016) – poet and author
 Wilfred Adolphus Domingo (1889-1968) – writer, journalist and activist
 Stacy-Ann Gooden – broadcaster and model
 Lester Holt – TV news anchor
 Donna Hylton – author
 Marlon James – author, Man Booker Prize winner
 June Jordan (1936-2002) – award-winning poet, author and activist.
 Shara McCallum – award-winning poet
 Claude McKay (1890-1948) – writer and poet, central figure in the Harlem Renaissance.
 Gil Noble (1932-2012) – TV reporter and interviewer
 Patricia Powell – award-winning writer
 Joel Augustus Rogers (1880/83-1966)  – journalist, author and historian
 Al Roker – TV weather anchor
 Louis Simpson (1923-2012) – Pulitzer prize winning poet
 Stephen A. Smith - sports journalist
 Frederick de Sola Mendes (1850-1927) – author and editor
 Ekwueme Michael Thelwell – award-winning novelist and essayist
 Jenna Wolfe – journalist and personal trainer
 Fiona Zedde – fiction writer

Others

 Janeshia Adams-Ginyard – actress, stunt woman and professional wrestler
 Maurice Ashley – chess grandmaster 
 King Bach – Internet personality, actor, composer, rapper and comedian
 Tyson Beckford – model and actor
 Cedella Booker (1926–2008) – singer, writer, mother of Bob Marley
 Desus Nice – comedian
 Louis Farrakhan – leader of the Nation of Islam
 Colin Ferguson – mass murderer
 Tanya Hamilton – film director and producer
 Barrington Irving – pilot who previously held the record for the youngest person to pilot a plane around the world solo. The first black person to accomplish this feat
 CJ Pearson – conservative contributor
 Angella Reid – White House Chief Usher, the first woman to hold the position
 Shawn Rhoden (1975–2021) – professional bodybuilder
 Ted Shearer (1919–1992) – advertising art director and cartoonist
 Toni-Ann Singh –  beauty queen who won Miss World 2019
 Alexis Skyy – reality television personality
 Marsha Thomason – British-born actress
 Dexter Williams – Miramar police chief

See also
 List of Jamaicans
 List of Jamaican British people
 Jamaican Canadian
 Marcus Garvey

References

Jamaican Americans
Americans
Jamaican